This is a list of defunct airlines of Slovakia.

See also
 List of airlines of Slovakia
 List of airports in Slovakia

References

Slovakia
Airlines
Airlines, defunct